Helicine arteries may refer to:
 helicine arteries of penis, arteries in the penis.
 helicine branches of uterine artery